Burkeville, British Columbia is a village located beside Russ Baker Way on Sea Island in Richmond, British Columbia. It was constructed in 1943 by the federal government of Canada. The street names have an aeronautical theme, many of which bear the names of airplane manufacturers. It also served to provide housing for workers employed at a plant operated by Boeing and was named after its then-president, Stanley Burke. After the war, many of the homes were sold to returning veterans. The entire village featured almost one bungalow homestyle. The village has since been annexed by the city of Richmond and is the only residential area on Sea Island, which otherwise is dominated by Vancouver International Airport.

The village was the hometown of aviation pioneer Dan McIvor.

References

External links
History of Vancouver for 1943.

Populated places on the Fraser River
Lower Mainland
Sea Island (British Columbia)
Neighbourhoods in Richmond, British Columbia